Allen Edward Ertel (November 7, 1937 – November 19, 2015) was an American politician who served as a Democratic member of the U.S. House of Representatives for Pennsylvania's 17th congressional district from 1977 to 1983.

Early life
Allen Ertel was born in Williamsport, Pennsylvania. He graduated with an AB from Dartmouth College in 1958, an MS from the Thayer School of Engineering and MBA from the Tuck School of Business in 1959, and a LL.B. Yale Law School in 1965. He served in the United States Navy from 1959 to 1962.

Career

He clerked for Chief Judge Caleb Wright of the Federal District Court of Delaware from 1965 to 1966, and was the Lycoming County district attorney from 1967 to 1977. He was a delegate to Democratic National Convention in 1972.

Ertel was elected in 1976 as a Democrat to the 95th, 96th, and 97th Congresses. He was not a candidate for reelection in 1982, but was an unsuccessful candidate for Governor of Pennsylvania. After his unsuccessful run for governor, he unsuccessfully sought the office of Pennsylvania Attorney General in 1984, before returning to the practice of law in Williamsport.

Death
Ertel died on November 19, 2015 in Williamsport, Pennsylvania after suddenly collapsing, aged 78. He was survived by his wife Catherine and their two children.

References

External links

1937 births
2015 deaths
Democratic Party members of the United States House of Representatives from Pennsylvania
Thayer School of Engineering alumni
Tuck School of Business alumni
Yale Law School alumni
County district attorneys in Pennsylvania
Politicians from Williamsport, Pennsylvania
20th-century American politicians